A list of works by or about Jill Lepore, American historian.

Books

Non-fiction

Novels

Articles and essays

Critical studies and reviews of Lepore's work

Notes

Bibliographies by writer
Bibliographies of American writers